Bataan dialect may refer to:
The Tagalog language dialect spoken in Bataan
The Kapampangan language dialect spoken in Bataan
The Mariveleño language